Greg Williamson may refer to:

Greg Williamson (drummer) (born 1978), Canadian drummer, musician and songwriter
Greg Williamson (poet) (born 1964), American poet
Greg Williamson (politician),  mayor of North Queensland's Mackay Regional Council
Greg Williamson (jazz musician), jazz drummer, composer, musician